Von (Hope) is the debut studio album by Icelandic post-rock band Sigur Rós, released on 14 June 1997 by Smekkleysa Records. Production lasted over two years, and the end result sounded significantly different from the original recordings. The band considered scrapping the final result, but decided not as it would have made the process too long. In exchange for recording time, Sigur Rós painted the studio they recorded in.

Von was originally released in Iceland to positive reviews from critics, but went relatively unnoticed abroad. In the first year following its release, Von sold only 313 copies in Iceland. In 2005, Von and Ágætis byrjun were declared platinum albums in Iceland, signifying domestic sales of over 5,000.

Composition
The sixth track consists of 18 seconds of silence, and gave name to Sigur Rós's official website, 'eighteen seconds before sunrise'. The last track starts with six minutes and fifteen seconds of silence, then consists of a portion of "Myrkur" played backwards, hence the name of "Rukrym."

The tracks "Hafssól" and "Von" were later re-recorded with different arrangements, the former released as a B-side to the Hoppípolla single and both appearing on 2007's Hvarf/Heim.

Artwork
The cover depicts Jónsi's sister Inga Birgisdóttir as a baby.

Track listing

Personnel 
 Jón Þór Birgisson – vocals, guitar
 Georg Hólm – bass
 Ágúst Ævar Gunnarsson – drums

References

External links
 Official page about the album
 Selected tracks from album available on group's website
 Von and Ágætis byrjun go platinum in Iceland

1997 debut albums
Sigur Rós albums